No Mercy, No Fear is the second mixtape by hip hop group G-Unit. It was recorded after de facto leader 50 Cent had signed a $1 million deal with Aftermath Entertainment and Shady Records following the release of his 2002 compilation album Guess Who's Back?. It featured the hit single "Wanksta", which was added onto the 8 Mile soundtrack album and later as a bonus track on his 2003 commercial debut album Get Rich or Die Tryin'. It also contained the freestyle to Puff Daddy's song "Victory", from the album No Way Out, which was later used on Bad Boy Records's compilation album Bad Boy's 10th Anniversary... The Hits. The mixtape was ranked No. 5 on XXLs Top 20 Mixtapes list.

Track listing

References

External links
[ No Mercy, No Fear] Billboard. Accessed 11 August 2007.

50 Cent albums
2002 mixtape albums
G-Unit albums